Homona coffearia, the tea tortrix or camellia tortrix, is a moth of the family Tortricidae. The species was first described by Nietner in 1861. It is widely distributed in the Oriental region.

Description
The wingspan is 16–20 mm for males and about 23 mm for females. The ground colour of the forewings in males is greyish brown, with brown markings and a darker spot at the costa. The hindwings are dark fuscous. In females, the forewings are pale brown, almost without distinct markings. Adults are on wing between December and April in Sri Lanka. There are two generations per year in China with adults appearing in late May.

Ecology
The larvae feed on Acacia auriculiformis, Arachis hypogaea, Bauhinia, Cajanus indicus, Calophyllum inophyllum, Camellia sinensis, Cinnamomum, Citrus, Coffea, Crotalaria, Derris, Eucalyptus alba, Eugenia polyantha, Glochidion, Gossypium, Linum, Melochia indica, Nephelium, Pluchea indica and Pyrus. Newly hatched larvae mostly move upwards to the growing points of their host plant and begin feeding. From the second to the fifth and final instar, they make nests by webbing two or more leaves together. A single larva usually makes several nests. Pupation takes place within the final nest.

Life cycle
The tea tortrix has a life cycle which takes about 35 to 49 days to complete. Immediately after copulation, adult females lay 100 to 150 clusters of egg on the surface of the leaves of host plant. Eggs are scaly and minute with overlapping appearance. After 6 to 8 days of laying, larvae hatch from the eggs. Larvae complete five instars and become fully grown after 3 to 4 weeks. Fully grown caterpillar is about 22 mm in length. Pupation occurs in the folds of the leaves. After 6–8 days of pupal life, adult emerges.

Control
Adults can be mechanically removed by hand and light traps. Parasite Macrocentrus homonae used successfully in tea estates of Sri Lanka and India. In Sri Lanka, egg parasitoid Trichogramma erosicornis was used but results were not encouraging. New Guinea effectively used Theronia simillima and Camptotypus clotho to control the caterpillars and adults. Several chemical pesticides such as aminocarb, fenitrothion and formothion are effective, but they also destroy natural enemies of the moth.

Distribution

Homona coffearia is found in Asia and on two occasions has been found in Great Britain. In Sussex. three Camellia plants imported from Japan, during the winter of 1964, produced three moths which emerged in April. There are also two records of the moth from Torpoint in Cornwall.

References

External links
Sex pheromone of the tea tortrix moth (Homona coffearia Neitner)
Macrocentrus homonae-a polyembryonic Parasite of Tea Tortrix Homona coffearia
Diets for Rearing the Tea Tortrix, Homona coffearia (Lepidoptera: Tortricidae) in Vitro
Semiochemicals of Homona coffearia, the Coffee tortrix

Homona (moth)
Moths described in 1861
Moths of Asia
Taxa named by John Nietner